The 1848 United States presidential election in New Hampshire took place on November 7, 1848, as part of the 1848 United States presidential election. Voters chose six representatives, or electors to the Electoral College, who voted for President and Vice President.

New Hampshire voted for the Democratic candidate, Lewis Cass, over Whig candidate Zachary Taylor and Free Soil candidate former president Martin Van Buren. Cass won the state by a margin of 25.91%. This was the last time until 2004 that a Democrat carried New Hampshire without winning the presidency.

Results

See also
 United States presidential elections in New Hampshire

References

New Hampshire
1848
1848 New Hampshire elections